Eat Raw for Breakfast is the eleventh studio album by German Trance duo Blank & Jones. It was released on 18 December 2009. Soundcolours #SC 0309.

Track listing             
"Menue (Intro)" - 2:20
"The Night Starts Here - With Stars (Raw For Dinner Remix)" - 7:43
"Dreams (Boom Box Remix)" - 4:06
"Relax (Your Mind)" - feat. Jason Caesar - 5:55 
"Steak & Eggs" - 5:58
"Lazy Life (Summer Vibe Dub Remix)" - feat. Keane - 6:07
"Butterfisch (Raw Like Sushi Remix)" - 8:33
"Trömmelsche (Raw Tech Remix)" - 7:11
"Beyond Time (Revisited)" - 7:34
"Iced Cream" - 6:26
"Eat Raw For Breakfast Nonstop" - 47:29

References

External links
 Blank & Jones - Official website

Blank & Jones albums
2009 albums